Compsodrillia jaculum, common name the javelin turrid, is a species of sea snail, a marine gastropod mollusk in the family Pseudomelatomidae, the turrids and allies.

Description
The length of the shell varies between 15 mm and 20 mm.

Distribution
This species occurs in the Pacific Ocean between Costa Rica and Ecuador.

References

 Pilsbry, Henry Augustus, and Herbert N. Lowe. "West Mexican and Central American mollusks collected by HN Lowe, 1929-31." Proceedings of the Academy of Natural Sciences of Philadelphia (1932): 33-144.

External links
 
 

jaculum
Gastropods described in 1932